Robert Etcheverry (1937-2007) was a French actor.

He may be mainly known in Britain as the hero of The Flashing Blade. He was married to Bérangère Vattier for 20 years which resulted a daughter. His younger brother was the handball player Jean-Pierre Etcheverry.

Filmography
 La fille du torrent (1962)
 Le Coup de pistolet (1965)
 The Seagull (1966)
 The Flashing Blade (1967)
 Isabelle (1970)
 Arpad, the Gypsy (1973)
 Operation Leopard (1980) 
 A Captain's Honor (1982)
 S.A.S. à San Salvador (1983)
 Julien Fontanes, magistrat (1986)
 Commissaire Moulin (1989)
 Les Cinq Dernières Minutes (1990)

Theatrical Stage 
 Bérénice (1956)
 Les Misérables (1957)
 Ruy Blas (1961)
 Life of Galileo (1963) 
 The Trojan War Will Not Take Place (1963)
 The Death of Seneca (1963)
 Lucrèce Borgia (1964-65)
 Liolà (1965)
 Le Barbier de Séville (1965)

External links

1937 births
2007 deaths
French male actors